John Snow, Inc. (JSI) is a global public health consulting organization dedicated to greater health equity and improving the health of individuals and communities, and providing an environment where people of passion can pursue this cause. Named after the English physician John Snow, JSI, with its nonprofit partner JSI Research & Training Institute, Inc., provides technical and managerial assistance to public health programs worldwide. JSI manages the Partnership for Supply Chain Management (PFSCM) and is affiliated with World Education, Inc.

JSI was founded  in 1978 by Joel Lamstein and Norbert Hirschhorn. In 2022, Margaret Crotty was appointed as CEO and president, succeeding founder Lamstein. The firm is based in Boston.

Activities 
JSI brings people together to identify public health problems, find and implement equitable solutions, and measure their effectiveness.

JSI collaborates with government agencies, the private sector, and local nonprofit and civil society organizations to identify and implement solutions to public health challenges. These partnerships improve the quality, accessibility, and equity of health systems and lead to better health outcomes. JSI conducts research and provides technical assistance to enable agencies and health professionals to address the needs of families they serve, especially the poor and underserved.

JSI's work is centered on the following technical areas:
 Aging
 Adolescent health
 Behavioral health, including substance use
 Environmental health
 Emergency preparedness
 Family planning
 HIV/AIDS
 Health care financing
 Healthcare reform
 Health services delivery
 Health supply chain logistics, including contraceptive security
 Immunization
 Infectious diseases
 Health information technology
 Public health systems
 Quality management
 Women's health
 Emerging health threats

On January 8, 2010, as Secretary of State Hillary Clinton spoke on the 15th anniversary of the 1994 Cairo International Conference on Population and Development (ICPD), JSI president Joel Lamstein appeared as a guest blogger in the Huffington Post. The article, "Re-Discovering U.S. Leadership: An Unlikely Contender", highlights issues facing woman around the world—in particular refugees and those displaced—as Secretary Clinton reaffirmed the U.S. government's support for universal access to reproductive health. Lamstein wrote, "Secretary of State Hillary Clinton will emphasize the U.S.'s commitment to advancing reproductive health worldwide. There will be strong words and very good intentions. However, what is needed is strong action and the political will to do what it takes to save lives and strengthen communities around the world."

JSI was the managing partner in the Supply Chain Management System (SCMS) project, which was funded by the US government's PEPFAR program. PRI's news radio show The World featured a story on the 8000-mile journey that antiretroviral (ARV) medication takes from factory to the consumer. Titled "Delivering AIDS Drugs: The Long Journey" and reported by David Baron, the medication is followed from its point of manufacture in India, to the remote village of Grabo in Côte d'Ivoire, where a woman named Grace is anxiously awaiting its arrival. SCMS helps get essential, life-saving medication to people in developing countries who live with AIDS.

JSI conducted a study of infections in Massachusetts hospitals, "Hospital Staffing and Health Care-Associated Infections: A Systematic Review of the Literature" in the October 2008 issue of Clinical Infectious Diseases (2008; 47:937-44). The article is part of the evidence review that the JSI team has carried out for the Massachusetts Department of Public Health's Healthcare-Associated Infection project. The efforts are focused on eliminating preventable infections through application of clinical 'best practices' and other incentives across Massachusetts hospitals.

JSI staff co-authored an article in the Journal of Public Health Management & Practice on the use of computer modeling in emergency preparedness.

In Connecticut, as the state recognized the need to adopt modern information technology in medical-records management, it turned to JSI to assist with developing a statewide plan to phase in a standardized electronic system for the state's doctors, hospitals, and other healthcare providers to use in creating, storing, and exchanging medical records. The plan was submitted to the Connecticut legislature for review by the state's lawmakers.

Fellowships 
Since 2001, JSI has funded the Mabelle Arole Fellowship, which it founded in collaboration with the American Medical Student Association in honor of Dr. Mabelle Arole. The fellowship is named in memory of her dedication to the Jamkhed, India community and her wisdom to work with its members to determine what must be done and how to achieve improved child and maternal health status. This award is given annually to a recent college graduate to study community-based primary health care in Jamkhed.

References

External links 
 
 Partnership for Supply Chain Management
 US Title X Reproductive Health National Training Center
 Advancing Partners & Communities Project
 SPRING Nutrition Project

International medical and health organizations
Health care companies based in Massachusetts
Public health organizations
Companies based in Boston
Consulting firms established in 1978